Membrane progesterone receptor gamma (mPRγ), or progestin and adipoQ receptor 5 (PAQR5), is a protein that in humans is encoded by the PAQR5 gene.

See also
 Membrane progesterone receptor
 Progestin and adipoQ receptor

References

7TM receptors